= Platyischnopidae =

Scientific classification
- Kingdom: Animalia
- Phylum: Arthropoda
- Clade: Pancrustacea
- Class: Malacostraca
- Order: Amphipoda
- Parvorder: Haustoriidira
- Superfamily: Haustorioidea
- Family: Platyischnopidae; Barnard & Drummond, 1979

Family of crustaceans

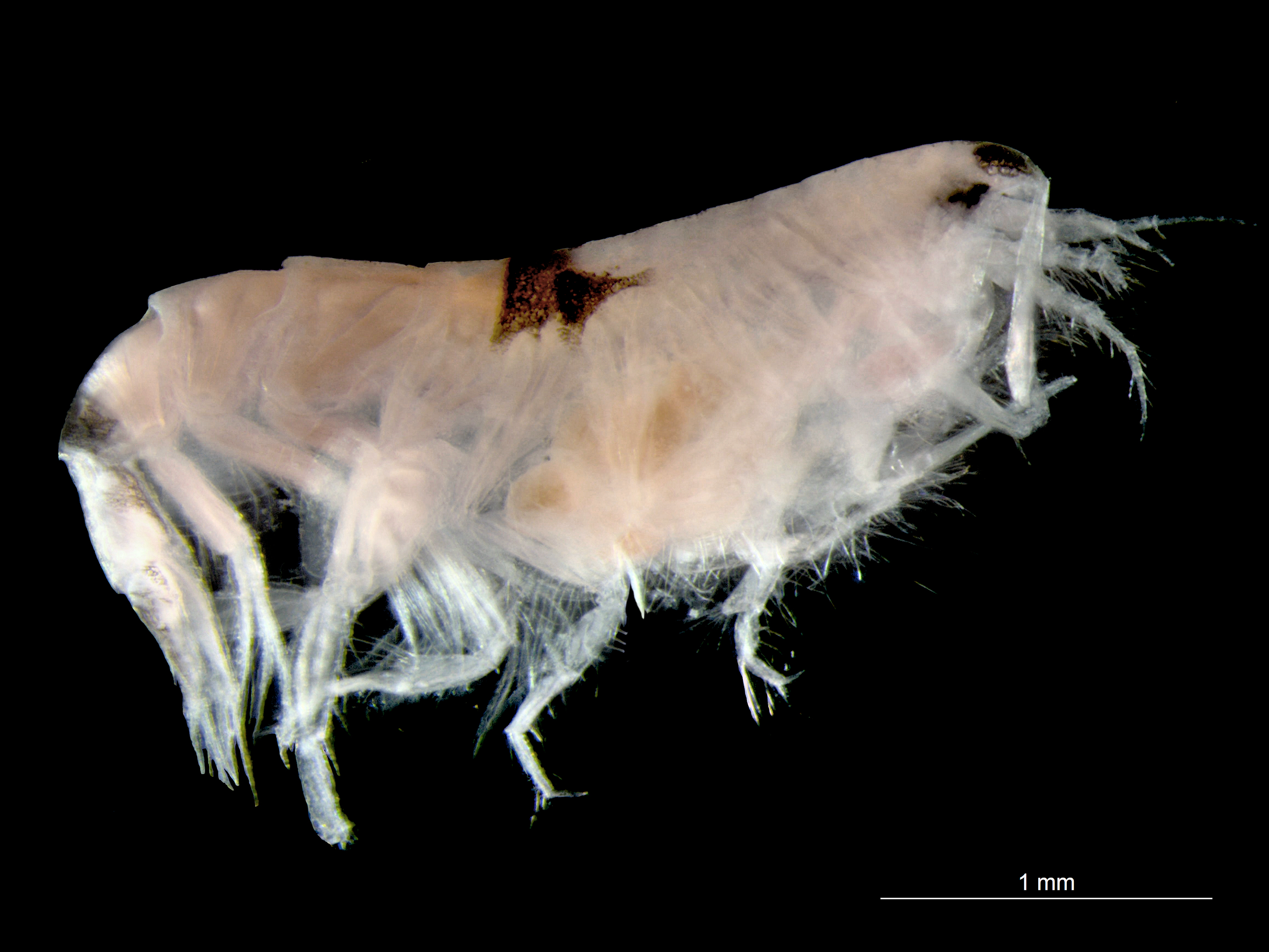

Platyischnopidae is a family of amphipod crustaceans. Its members are characterised by the conical rostrum, which is covered with sensory pits at the end. Although digging behaviour has only been directly observed in a few taxa, it is assumed that all the animals in the family Platyischnopidae are fossorial. The genera included in Platyischnopidae are Skaptopus, Platyischnopus, Indischnopus, Tiburonella, Eudevenopus, Tittakunara, Tomituka and Yurrokus.
